Blera fallax  or the pine hoverfly is a rare species of hoverfly normally associated with mature pine tree in Northern and Central Europe.

Biology
The pine hoverfly larva, which are of the rat-tailed maggot type, normally develop in damp rot holes of felled or fallen pine  trees, notably the Scots pine (Pinus sylvestris), though it will occur with other conifers. Preference is for large stumps where there has been some heartwood softening by the fungus Phaeolus schweinitzii. Adult flies have been seen feeding on wild raspberry flowers, but little else is known about adult behaviour.

Conservation
In Scotland, attempts have been made on RSPB sites to create artificial rot holes in felled pine stumps. This has led to a slight increase in numbers of adults in some areas, though numbers are still very low and causing some concern.

References

External links

Eristalinae
Diptera of Europe
Flies described in 1758
Taxa named by Carl Linnaeus